Ideas on the Nature of Science is a book by Canadian author and radio producer David Cayley. It is a compilation of his conversations that took place during the CBC Radio series "How to Think About Science" for the program Ideas.

External links
 How to Think About Science

2009 non-fiction books
Canadian non-fiction books
English-language books
Philosophy of science books
Goose Lane Editions books